Quanjude is a Chinese restaurant known for its Peking roast duck and its longstanding culinary heritage since its establishment in 1864 in Beijing, China.

Company profile and branches
The restaurant chain sells over 2 million roast ducks served in 400 different styles to over 5 million customers annually.

After a merger in 2004 with Beijing New Yansha Group, Quanjude is now a part of the Beijing Tourism Group.

In China 
There are 50 affiliates across China.  The first directly run flagship store opened in Changchun, Jilin Province in January 2007.

Beijing 

Quanjude has eight direct branches in Beijing.  The original location operates in Qianmen with several other branches in other locations in Beijing.

There is a seven-story restaurant on Hepingmen Ave., a location hand-picked by former Chinese Premier Zhou Enlai. Serving up to 5,000 meals a day, this restaurant covers a floor area of 15,000 square meters with over forty private dining rooms and can simultaneously seat 2,000 guests.

Having established a history and affiliation with the Chinese government at the municipal and central state level, Quanjude has often been used to hold state banquets and to receive celebrities, dignitaries, and important government figures from over 200 countries as distinguished VIP guests.

Hong Kong 
There is one Quanjude branch in Hong Kong, in Tsim Sha Tsui, where it is known as "Quanjude Roast Duck Restaurant (全聚德烤鴨店)".

Outside China 

In 2017, the first branch outside of China and Taiwan opened in Melbourne, Australia. Since then another has opened in Sydney in 2018. As of 2023, both branches in Australia have shut down permanently.

QJD also has a restaurant in Toronto, Canada and Lisbon, Portugal. The chain also has three restaurants in Tokyo, Japan.

History 

Quanjude was established in 1864 during the Qing dynasty under the reign of the Tongzhi Emperor. Although Peking duck can trace its history many centuries back, Quanjude's heritage of roast duck preparation – using open ovens and non-smoky hardwood fuel such as Chinese date, peach, or pear to add a subtle fruity flavor with a golden crisp to the skin – was originally reserved for the imperial families.

The first Quanjude manager, Yang Renquan, who started out selling chicken and ducks, paid a retired chef from the palace for the imperial recipe. Soon after, Quanjude began to serve roast duck from the imperial kitchen to the common masses. Yang Renquan opened his first, small Dejuquan (德聚全, the three characters being reversed from the current name) inside Yangrou Hutong in Qianmen (前門), which at the time was one of the busiest areas in Beijing. His restaurant became an instant success and has since grown into the current branch in Qianmen that employs over 400 staff members and can occupy 900 guests at one time. The Qianmen restaurant, along with the many other Quanjude branches, together form one of the largest food enterprises in the nation.

See also
 Bianyifang
 Da Dong Roast Duck Restaurant

References

External links 

 
 "Beijing this Month" article on Quanjude
 Introduction of Beijing duck at Quanjude from "Beijing"

Restaurants in Beijing
1864 establishments in China
Companies based in Beijing
Restaurants established in 1864
Dongcheng District, Beijing
19th century in Beijing